Nea Elvetia (literally New Switzerland) is an under-construction metro station serving Thessaloniki Metro's Line 1. It will serve as the eastern terminus of the line and is expected to enter service in 2020. The  lies east of Nea Elvetia station.

The oldest proposal for a station at this general location goes back to 1918, when it was proposed as a terminus for a Metropolitan Railway line essentially running the same route as the current Line 1. The main difference with the current station is that the 1918 proposal listed an overground station, whereas this station is underground. Nea Elvetia station also appears in the 1988 Thessaloniki Metro proposal.

References

See also
List of Thessaloniki Metro stations

Thessaloniki Metro